Vasile Vatamanu (died 18 December 2011) was a Moldovan politician.

He served as member of the Parliament of Moldova.

External links 
 Cine au fost şi ce fac deputaţii primului Parlament din R. Moldova (1990-1994)?
 Declaraţia deputaţilor din primul Parlament
 Site-ul Parlamentului Republicii Moldova

References

Moldovan MPs 1990–1994
Popular Front of Moldova MPs
2011 deaths
Year of birth missing

Recipients of the Order of Honour (Moldova)